Janet Elizabeth Aalfs (born August 14, 1956) is an American poet and martial artist. She is a founding member of Valley Women's Martial Arts and the National Women's Martial Arts Federation, and founder and director of Lotus Peace Arts. She served as poet laureate of Northampton, Massachusetts from 2003 to 2005.

Life and work
As a 13-year-old, Aalfs wrote her first poem, and began focusing on her writing practice. Her father (1922–2001), a minister, is credited with teaching Aalfs about the Civil Rights Movement of the 1960s. By the age of sixteen, Aalfs had participated in assisting her mother in the founding of the women's center in New Bedford, Massachusetts, read and found inspiration in Sisterhood is Powerful, and had her poems published by the women's center at Southeastern Massachusetts University.

During her first year at Hampshire College, in 1974, she joined the women's center and registered for women's studies classes at University of Massachusetts, which shared classes with Hampshire.  While still in college, Aalfs came out of the closet as a lesbian. She would go on to get her Master's of Fine Arts degree from Sarah Lawrence College.  Shortly thereafter she founded a women's writing group, and eventually two lesbian writing groups: Calypso Borealis and the Tuesday Night Lesbian Writers Group. She also founded Orogeny Press, a publishing house for fiction and lesbian poetry.

In 1978, Aalfs began practicing martial arts and became a founding member of Valley Women's Martial Arts and the Institute for Healing and Violence Prevention Strategies (VWMA/HAVPS) and the National Women's Martial Arts Federation.  Aalfs, founder and director of Lotus Peace Arts, has served as the director and member of the Leaders Group of VWMA since 1982.  She holds a seventh-degree black belt in Shuri-ryū, a sixth-degree black belt in Modern Arnis, and is a Jian Mei Chief Instructor of tai chi and qigong.

Between 2003 and 2005, she served as the poet laureate for Northampton, Massachusetts. In 2013, she received the Leadership and Advocacy in the Arts Award from the Center for Women and Community, University of Massachusetts Amherst.

Further reading

Works by Janet Aalfs
with Carol Wiley. Martial Arts Teachers on Teaching. Mumbai: Frog Books (1995). 
Reach. Florence: Perugia Press (1999). 
"Women and the martial arts." Women of Power 3 (1986).

References

External links
"Janet Aalfs teaches fifth-graders about the power of words" from the Daily Hampshire Gazette.

1956 births
20th-century American poets
20th-century American women writers
21st-century American poets
21st-century American women writers
American female martial artists
American women poets
Hampshire College alumni
American lesbian writers
American LGBT poets
LGBT people from Massachusetts
LGBT people from New York (state)
Living people
Municipal Poets Laureate in the United States
People from New Bedford, Massachusetts
Sarah Lawrence College alumni
Writers from Massachusetts
Poets from Massachusetts